Al Markhiya is a neighborhood of Doha, Qatar. It is one of the later-developed areas of northern Doha. The district hosts three awsaq al-furjan complexes, which are part of a development project by the government to host all commercial establishments in centralized areas.

Etymology
The district received its name from a tree that grows abundantly in the area known locally as "markh" (Leptadenia pyrotechnica).

History
In J.G. Lorimer's 1908 geography section of the Gazetteer of the Persian Gulf, Al Markhiya was described as a camping ground with a masonry well and a garden. The garden, which was established by former emir Jassim bin Mohammed Al Thani, was enclosed by a wall and was used for date palm cultivation. Lorimer noted that it appeared to be one of the only seven sizable date palm plantations in Qatar.

Geography
Al Markhiya borders the following districts:
Lejbailat to the east, separated by Abdul Aziz Bin Jassim Street.
Hazm Al Markhiya to the north, separated by Al Markhiya Street.
Dahl Al Hamam to the west, separated by Bu Shaddad Street.
Fereej Kulaib to the south, separated by Khalifa Street.

Landmarks

Al Hazm Mall
Partially opened in May 2017 by Al Emady Enterprise, Al Hazm Mall is a luxurious shopping complex bearing Italian-style architecture. At a cost of QR 3 billion, the marble was imported from Italy, the stone from Palestine, and its architects were flown in from Rajasthan, India. It is accessible through Al Markhiya Street.

Al Markhiya Sports Club
Al Markhiya Sports Club's headquarters and stadium are located off of Al Markhiya Street.

Transport
Major roads that run through the district are Abdul Aziz Bin Jassim Street, Al Markhiya Street and Khalifa Street.

Demographics
As of the 2010 census, the district comprised 1009 housing units and 200 establishments. There were 5,197 people living in the district, of which 56% were male and 44% were female. Out of the 5,179 inhabitants, 69% were 20 years of age or older and 31% were under the age of 20. The literacy rate stood at 97.2%.

Employed persons made up 53% of the total population. Females accounted for 30% of the working population, while males accounted for 70% of the working population.

References

External links
Gallery website

Doha
Communities in Doha